Merger Island is an ice-covered island  long at the entrance of Haydn Inlet, lying off the west coast of Alexander Island, Antarctica. It was first mapped from air photos taken by the Ronne Antarctic Research Expedition in 1947–48 by D. Searle of the Falkland Islands Dependencies Survey in 1960. The name given by the UK Antarctic Place-Names Committee is descriptive, the island being almost submerged in the surrounding Wilkins Ice Shelf.

See also 
 List of Antarctic and sub-Antarctic islands

References

Islands of Alexander Island